As Hurricane Isaias moved up the East Coast of the United States, a damaging outbreak of 39 tornadoes impacted areas from South Carolina to Connecticut between August 3–4, 2020. The most significant tornado of the outbreak was a large and intense EF3 tornado that obliterated a mobile home park near Windsor, North Carolina, killing two and injuring 14. This was the strongest tornado in the United States to be spawned by a tropical cyclone since 2005. In the end, the outbreak killed two and injured 26.

Meteorological synopsis

After weakening to a tropical storm southeast of Florida, Isaias quickly re-intensified to hurricane status as it approached its final landfall point of Ocean Isle Beach, North Carolina on August 3. A cold front and upper-level trough that was influencing the storm's movement enhanced the shear profiles across the region and a slight risk for severe weather was issued by the Storm Prediction Center (SPC) in their 1300 UTC update for Northeastern South Carolina and Northeastern North Carolina. Numerous embedded low-topped supercells formed overnight, producing many tornadoes and causing widespread damage, primarily to the north and east of the center of Isaias.

With the tornado outbreak already underway and likely to continue, the SPC issued an enhanced risk in their 1300 UTC update from the Northeastern Delmarva Peninsula to the Tri-State area on August 4, east of the forecast track where wind shear was maximized. Numerous tornadoes, a few of which were strong, continued to touch down throughout the morning before abruptly ceasing around midday after the storm moved into New England and transitioned into an extratropical cyclone. In the end, a total of 109 tornado warnings were issued by various National Weather Service offices across a swath of 12 states due to Hurricane Isaias.

Confirmed tornadoes

August 3 event

August 4 event

Woodard–Windsor, North Carolina

This intense and destructive tornado first touched down southwest of Woodard just north of the Roanoke River, and rapidly intensified as it moved northwest and crossed Knowles Lane. As it reached Middle Track Road, the tornado reached its peak intensity, completely destroying three mobile homes, a barn, and a single-story frame home at EF3 strength. The frame home was completely leveled, but was not anchored to its foundation. The tornado maintained its strength while reaching its peak width as it struck a mobile home park along Morning Road. A dozen mobile homes were destroyed and several others were severely damaged. Some of the mobile homes were obliterated, with their metal frames twisted and the debris scattered long distances through a nearby field. Several vehicles were tossed in this area as well. The two fatalities occurred at the mobile home park. The tornado then continued northwestward and weakened slightly to EF2 intensity, flattening a large swath of trees and causing significant damage to some homes in neighborhoods along or just off of Woodward Road. The tornado weakened further to EF1 strength as it damaged multiple businesses and homes along the concurrent US 17/Bypass US 17  and US 13 just west of Windsor. Several farm buildings were damaged northwest of Windsor before the tornado dissipated along NC 308.

Two people were killed and 14 others were injured. The tornado was rated EF3, making it the strongest tornado spawned by a tropical cyclone since 2005. After the storm, North Carolina Governor Roy Cooper, toured the mobile home park hit by the tornado in Windsor, saying it was "devastating" to see what happened to the area.

Dover–Townsend–Middletown–Glasgow, Delaware

As this tornado touched down on the southern side of Dover, it did significant damage to trees, some of which fell on homes. The tornado crossed US 13, where it blew off sections of roofing at a middle school. A nearby warehouse had metal walls torn off, and some tractor trailers were blown onto their sides. A garage was also severely damaged. Damage along this first segment of the path was rated EF1. Past Dover, the tornado produced intermittent tree damage before impacting the east side of Smyrna, where more significant tree damage occurred. A weather station run by DelDOT measured a  wind gust on DE 1 north of Smyrna as the tornado passed by. The tornado destroyed a car repair facility on the south end of Smyrna and damaged numerous houses. The tornado then nearly paralleled US 13 and DE 1 through the eastern side of Townsend at high-end EF1 strength, causing considerable damage to homes and businesses. Numerous trees were snapped or uprooted, and a garage was also destroyed. The most intense damage in Townsend occurred within the vicinity of Blackbird Landing Road and Gum Bush Road. The tornado then reached low-end EF2 intensity as it struck Middletown, where many homes near Spring Hollow Drive sustained significant roof, exterior wall, and garage door damage. A few of these homes sustained at least partial exterior wall loss, including one poorly-constructed home that had an entire second-floor exterior wall ripped off. Low-end EF2 damage continued near Summit Bridge as multiple additional homes sustained considerable damage to the north of Middletown, one of which had half of its roof torn of. Many trees were snapped, and several other homes lost portions of their roofs in this area. Farther along the path, the tornado maintained low-end EF2 intensity as it tracked near Lums Pond and through portions of Bear, where more homes were damaged and trees were downed. The most significant damage along this segment of the path occurred as the tornado crossed DE 896 and into the Brennan Estates subdivision, where 12 homes were damaged to the point where they were declared uninhabitable. The tornado then rapidly weakened and finally lifted to the southwest of Glasgow, just prior to crossing into Cecil County, Maryland.

It was the longest tracked tornado in Delaware since 1950.

Northeast Philadelphia–Doylestown, Pennsylvania

This intermittent, but strong tornado first touched down just east of the Philadelphia Mills shopping mall in Northeast Philadelphia, and moved northwest at EF1 strength. At a former Walmart building undergoing reconstruction, three exhaust systems and six RTU systems were blown off the roof. Roofing, siding and awnings were blown off many homes in the area, and some cars were either tossed or flipped. Trees were snapped or uprooted, including some which were over 100-years-old. The tornado then lifted before briefly touching down in Southampton at a slightly weaker low-end EF1 intensity. Numerous trees and tree limbs were snapped, including some that damaged homes and cars. After lifting again, the tornado touched down a third time at its peak intensity of low-end EF2 in Doylestown. Bleachers on the visitors side of an athletic field at Central Bucks High School West were tossed before the tornado hit the Doylestown Hospital complex, tossing numerous vehicles in a parking lot. Some of these vehicles were piled atop one another, and six were thrown considerable distances. The tornado then struck the Children's Village Day Care center, causing significant damage as large portions of roof structure were torn from the building. Debris from this location was strewn through a nearby field. Numerous large trees were snapped or uprooted in Doylestown, and several metal light posts were bent to the ground. The tornado weakened back to EF1 intensity as it continued northwest, damaging homes and other properties, and snapping or uprooting trees. The tornado then lifted for the final time along Ferry Road near Lake Galena in Peace Valley Park.

There were six minor injuries.

See also

 List of North American tornadoes and tornado outbreaks
 Hurricane Katrina tornado outbreak
 Hurricane Rita tornado outbreak
 Hurricane Ida tornado outbreak

Notes

References

External links
 Tornado hits my house! Bear, Delaware tornado, August 4th, 2020.

Hurricane Isaias
Tornadoes of 2020
F3 tornadoes
Tornadoes in South Carolina
Tornadoes in North Carolina
Tornadoes in Virginia
Tornadoes in Maryland
Tornadoes in Delaware
Tornadoes in New Jersey
Tornadoes in Pennsylvania